Ian Forrester (born 1945) was a former judge in the General Court of the Court of Justice of the European Union (CJEU). He served from 7 October 2015 to 31 January 2020.

Education
Ian Forrester studied at the University of Glasgow, Scotland, between 1962 and 1967 and graduated with a Master of Arts in History and English Literature and a Bachelor of Laws. Later, in 1969, he graduated with a Master of Comparative Law from Tulane University, Louisiana, New Orleans.

Career
Prior to being appointed to the General Court, he practiced as a barrister in Scotland (with Maclay, Murray & Spens), and New York (with Davis Polk & Wardwell) until 1972, following which he appeared before the Court of Justice of the European Union in Brussels and the European Court of Human Rights in Strasbourg. He subsequently established Forrester & Norall, which merged with White & Case in 1997. In 2015, he established a pro bono programme at White & Case.

Selected cases
Ian Forrester appeared before the court in the following cases:

 BBC et al. v Commission (Case T-70/89)
 Tillack v Belgium (Case 20477/05)

References

1945 births
Living people
Alumni of the University of Glasgow
Tulane University alumni
Scottish barristers
European Court of Justice judges
Davis Polk & Wardwell lawyers